Kubrzany  is a village in the administrative district of Gmina Jedwabne, within Łomża County, Podlaskie Voivodeship, in northeastern Poland.

References

Kubrzany